Tricalysia obstetrix is a species of plant in the family Rubiaceae. It is endemic to Gabon. It is threatened by habitat loss.

References

Flora of Gabon
Tricalysia
Vulnerable plants
Endemic flora of Gabon
Taxonomy articles created by Polbot